Doa District is a district in Tete Province in the central region of Mozambique. It had a population of 87,077 in 2017.

References

See also 

Districts in Tete Province